The 2022 Balochistan local government elections were held in 32 districts of Balochistan, Pakistan on 29 May 2022. Independent candidates won the most the seats, while 1584 candidates were elected unopposed. According to the results, 98 candidates of Jamiat Ulema-e-Islam (F), 71 of Balochistan Awami Party, 39 of Pashtunkhwa Milli Awami Party (PKMAP) and 37 of Balochistan National Party have won. Besides, National Party and PPP have won 26 seats, Tehreek-e-Insaf 7 seats and Pak Sarzamin Party (PSP) 5 seats.

See also
 Local government in Pakistan

References

2022 in Pakistan
2022 in Balochistan, Pakistan
May 2022 events in Pakistan
Local elections in Pakistan
Politics of Balochistan, Pakistan
2022 elections in Pakistan